Anatrachyntis tentoria is a moth in the family Cosmopterigidae. It was described by Edward Meyrick in 1911, and is known from the Seychelles and the Chagos Archipelago.

References

Moths described in 1911
Anatrachyntis
Moths of Africa